In and Out is a 1914 short film featuring Wallace Beery and Leo White. The short was produced by the Essanay Film Manufacturing Company and distributed by the General Film Company.

External links
 In and Out in the Internet Movie Database

1914 films
1914 comedy films
1914 short films
American black-and-white films
Silent American comedy films
American silent short films
American comedy short films
1910s American films